Speckled Mountain is a mountain located in western Maine. It can be ascended by the Bickford Brook, Spruce Hill, Cold Brook, Red Rock and Blueberry Ridge trails, and is a popular day hike. It is a part of the Caribou-Speckled Mountain Wilderness within the White Mountain National Forest. It is located near the AMC Cold River Camp.

Nearby mountains
Mountains adjacent to Speckled Mountain include:

 Durgin Mountain
 Blueberry Mountain
 Red Rock Mountain
 Caribou Mountain
 Ames Mountain

References

Mountains of Oxford County, Maine
Mountains of Maine